is a Japanese multinational keiretsu holding company which owns Hankyu Corporation, the Hanshin Electric Railway Co., Ltd.,  Toho Co., Ltd., and affiliate companies.

On October 1, 2006, Hankyu Holdings changed its name to the present corporate name following the merger with Hanshin Electric Railway. On the same day Hankyu Corporation Group was renamed Hankyu Hanshin Holdings Group, and the Hankyu Toho Group renamed Hankyu Hanshin Toho Group.

The operations of the company are centered on transportation, retailing, real estate, entertainment and media.

The transportation segment is the company's main cashflow generating business and comprises the railway companies Hanshin Electric Railway (acquired in 2006) and Hankyu Railway. It also includes the smaller railway lines of Hokushin Kyūkō Electric Railway and Nose Electric Railway, as well as equity stakes in Kita-Osaka Kyūkō Railway, Sanyo Electric Railway, Osaka Monorail and Kobe Electric Railway. The company also owns various taxi and bus franchises.

Hankyu and Hanshin also both had air cargo and express freight subsidiaries, which were combined in the Hankyu Hanshin Express Holdings company.

The retailing business is mainly concentrated in the company's large shareholding of H2O Retailing, the company formed via the merger of the Hankyu and Hanshin Department Store companies.

The company owns and operates many hotels, and is developing real estate projects mainly on land along its railway lines through its subsidiary Hankyu Realty, which was previously separately listed, but fully acquired through a stock swap in 2002. It has spun off some of its vast real estate holdings (such as the HEP Five building) into a REIT company, Hankyu Hanshin Properties.

The group has a controlling stake in Toho, which next to its many media interests (movie development and distribution, as well as a large stake in Fuji Media Holdings) has also large real estate interests. Other companies in the entertainment area include the Hanshin Tigers and the Takarazuka Revue, and stakes in Kansai TV and FM Osaka, as well as tourism operations (e.g. Hankyu Travel).

Major shareholders

(As of August 2009)

In 2006, the activist Fund Privee Zurich Turnaround Group run by Kenzo Matsumara (which later assumed the name Privee Investment Holding, was then acquired by e-Revolution co. Ltd. and now renamed Privee Fund Group) took a major stake in Hankyu Holdings, hoping to boost efficiencies in the very diverse holdings of the Hankyu-Toho group. However, the takeover of Hanshin Electric Railway by Hankyu in the wake of the affair surrounding Fund Manager Yoshiaki Murakami and the establishment by Hankyu management of anti-takeover measures, as well as the global financial crisis resulted in Privee reducing its stake in the company in 2008.

Listed companies in which Hankyu Hanshin Holdings directly holds a stake

 Kobe Electric Railway, first section of the Osaka Securities Exchange, 9046, 27.7% stake
 Sanyo Electric Railway, first section of the Osaka Securities Exchange 9052, 17.38% stake
 OS Company, Ltd., second section of the Osaka Securities Exchange 9637, 22% stake
 H2O Retailing, first section of the Tokyo Stock Exchange and Osaka Securities Exchange 8242, 21.8% stake
 Tokyo Rakutenchi Company, Ltd., first section of the Tokyo Stock Exchange 8842, 17.8% stake
 Hankyu REIT, first section of the Tokyo Stock Exchange 8977, 4.1% stake
 Toho Co, Ltd., first section of the Tokyo Stock Exchange and Osaka Securities Exchange, Fukuoka Stock Exchange 9602, 20.15% stake

Sports franchises
Hankyu once owned of a professional baseball team in Japan, known as the Hankyu Braves. In 1988, the team was sold to Orient Leasing Co. (which changed its name to Orix in 1989) and the team name became the Orix BlueWave and later the Orix Buffaloes. The Hankyu Braves were sold by then-president of Hankyu, Kohei Kobayashi, to finance the redevelopment of Umeda Station and Nishinomiya-Kitaguchi Station. By acquiring Hanshin Electric Railway, Hankyu-Hanshin Holdings became the owner of the baseball team Hanshin Tigers.

References

External links
Hankyu Hanshin Holdings, Inc. 
  Wiki collection of bibliographic works on Hankyu Hanshin Holdings

 
Companies based in Osaka Prefecture
Companies listed on the Osaka Exchange
Holding companies of Japan
Companies listed on the Tokyo Stock Exchange
Midori-kai
Japanese companies established in 1907
Holding companies established in 1907